The Kagawa Five Arrows (香川ファイブアローズ） are a Japanese basketball team, playing in the Western Conference of the B.League.  They are based in Takamatsu, Kagawa Prefecture. In July 2015 it was announced that the team will compete in the second division of the new Japan Professional Basketball League, which will commence from October 2016.

Roster

Notable players 

Morgan Hikaru Aiken
Paul Butorac
Babacar Camara
Michael Gardener
Anthony Kent (it)
George Leach
Brandon Penn
Kazuhiro Shoji
Rintaro Tokunaga
Justin Watts
Nyika Williams

Head coaches
Motofumi Aoki
Johnny Neumann
Atsushi Kanazawa
Kenzo Maeda
Nobuyoshi Ito
Hiromichi Tsuda
Joe Navarro
Kohei Eto
Paul Henare

Honors 
 bj league
 Runners-up (1) : 2006/2007

Problems 
Okayama Prefecture General Cooperation Agency has sued the Arrows for not paying gymnasium fees in 2016. The club was ¥120 million in debt as of April 17, 2015.

Season-by-season records 

Key:
 Win%: Winning percentage
 GB: Games behind

Arenas
Takamatsu City General Gymnasium
Takamatsu City Kagawa General Gymnasium
Kanonji City General Gymnasium
Toramaru Tebukuro Gymnasium
Zentsuji Citizens Gymnasium
Tonosho Town General Hall

Practice facilities
Takamatsu City Mure General Gymnasium (map)

References

Takamatsu Five Arrows at Asia-basket.com
  Official team web site

 
Basketball teams in Japan
Sports teams in Kagawa Prefecture
2006 establishments in Japan
Basketball teams established in 2006